David McDonald (born 2 January 1971) is an Irish retired football defender.

At Tottenham he only made three league appearances, one of which was playing the full 90 minutes as his side beat rivals Arsenal at Highbury on the last day of the 1992-93 season.

References

Since 1888... The Searchable Premiership and Football League Player Database (subscription required)

1971 births
Living people
Republic of Ireland association footballers
Republic of Ireland under-21 international footballers
Republic of Ireland B international footballers
Association football defenders
Premier League players
Tottenham Hotspur F.C. players
Gillingham F.C. players
Bradford City A.F.C. players
Reading F.C. players
Peterborough United F.C. players
Barnet F.C. players
Welling United F.C. players
Enfield F.C. players
English Football League players
Association footballers from Dublin (city)